The 2014–15 Western Michigan Broncos men's basketball team represented Western Michigan University (WMU) during the 2014–15 NCAA Division I men's basketball season. The Broncos, led by 12th year head coach Steve Hawkins, played their home games at University Arena as members of the West Division of the Mid-American Conference (MAC). They finished the season 20–14, 10–8 in MAC play to finish in third place in the West Division. They advanced to the second round of the MAC tournament where they lost to Akron. They were invited to the CollegeInsider.com Tournament where they lost in the first round to Cleveland State.

Roster
The 2014–15 roster is shown in the following table:

Schedule
The following is WMU's schedule.

|-
! colspan="9" style="background:#6a3e0f; color:#e3bc85;"| Regular season

|-
! colspan="9" style="background:#6a3e0f; color:#e3bc85;"| MAC tournament

|-
! colspan="9" style="background:#6a3e0f; color:#e3bc85;"| CIT

References

Western Michigan Broncos men's basketball seasons
Western Michigan
Western Michigan